Nordbyhagen is a village in Viken, Norway. The area is home to Akershus University Hospital (sometimes referred to as "Ahus").

References 

Villages in Akershus